Wahle:

 Ernst Wahle (1889, Magdeburg – 1981), a German archaeologist
  (1854,  – 1934), German lawyer
 Jakob Wahle (from Prague) ∞ Barbara Schenk
  (1861, Vienna – 1940), Jewish Austrian literary scholar
 Alfred Wahle ∞ Evelyne Strakosch
  (1887, Vienna – 1970), Jewish Austrian jurist
 Kurt Wahle (1855, Neuhof bei Düben – 1928), a Saxon-born German army officer
 Michael "Mike" James Wahle (born 1977, Portland, Oregon), an American football guard
 Otto Wahle (1879, Vienna – 1963, New York City), a Jewish Austrian-American swimmer
 Richard Wahle (1857, Vienna – 1935, Vienna), Jewish Austrian professor of philosophy

See also 
 Vahle
 Wahl (disambiguation)

German-language surnames
Jewish surnames

bg:Вале
ru:Вале